Jamie Pollard is an American athletic director who works at Iowa State University. Before Iowa State, Pollard served in various capacities in intercollegiate athletics at Wisconsin, Maryland and Saint Louis.

Early life
Pollard was born and raised in Oshkosh, Wisconsin, prior to attending University of Wisconsin–Oshkosh. At Wisconsin–Oshkosh he was a four year letter-winner in both cross country and track & field from 1983-1987. In cross country Pollard helped UW–Oshkosh to a fifth-place finish in 1983, a fourth-place finish in 1984, a second-place finish in 1985 and a fourth-place finish in 1986. In 1986 he had his best personal finish resulting in All-America status, a 24th-place finish at the NCAA Championship. In track & field his career culminated in an NCAA Championship in the 5,000 meter run in 1987.

Career

Early career
Post graduation Pollard was a CPA at Arthur Andersen & Company in Milwaukee, Wisconsin from 1987-1989. From there he transitioned into his first job in athletic administration becoming Associate AD for Internal Operations at Saint Louis University. At SLU he managed operations and oversaw balancing the budget for the athletic department. In 1994 he transitioned to a similar role at the University of Maryland. Then in 1998 Pollard became a Senior Associate AD for Administration and the CFO for the University of Wisconsin. In this role he oversaw all finances and fundraising efforts for the athletic department. In 2003 he was named to Sports Business Journal's Forty Under Forty List. In 2003 he was internally promoted to be the Deputy Athletic Director to serve as the number two under Barry Alvarez.

Iowa State
On September 19, 2005 it was announced that Pollard was hired as the Athletic Director at Iowa State.

Some highlights of his tenure at ISU include hiring head coaches Fred Hoiberg, Steve Prohm, T.J. Otzelberger, and Matt Campbell. He has overseen investments of over $160 million on athletic facilities including Jack Trice Stadium.

Personal life
Jamie and his wife Ellen have four children: Thomas, Annie, Margaret and James. Thomas, a member of the Iowa State Cross Country team, was named the Big 12 Newcomer of the Year in 2017. Margaret, a member of the University of Nebraska - Lincoln Cross Country Team, was awarded the Sam Foltz 27 Hero Leadership Award in 2021.

References

External links
 Iowa State Bio

Living people
Iowa State Cyclones athletic directors
College men's track and field athletes in the United States
Sportspeople from Oshkosh, Wisconsin
Businesspeople from Wisconsin
University of Wisconsin–Oshkosh alumni
Year of birth missing (living people)